Syed Anwarul Karim was a Bangladeshi diplomat and the first Permanent Representative of Bangladesh to the United Nations.

Early life 
Karim was born on 1928.

Career 

Karim was the Deputy Permanent Representative of Pakistan to the United Nations when the Bangladesh Liberation war started in 1971. He swore allegiance to the government of Bangladesh in exile defecting from the Pakistan mission in August 1971.

From January 1972 to July 1972, Karim was the Secretary at the Ministry of Foreign Affairs.

Karim was the first observer of Bangladesh to the United Nations and became the first Permanent Representative of Bangladesh to the United Nations after Bangladesh joined the United Nations in 1974.

Death 
Karim died on 17 March 2019 in Riverdale, The Bronx, New York City, United States from cancer.

References 

1928 births
2019 deaths
Bangladeshi diplomats
Ambassadors of Bangladesh to the United States
Foreign Secretaries of Bangladesh
Permanent Representatives of Bangladesh to the United Nations